Chen Zhili (born November 1942) is a retired senior Chinese politician who served as State Councilor and Minister of Education, and a Vice Chairperson of the National People's Congress. She was vice chairman of the organization commission of the 2008 Beijing Olympics.

Biography
Born in Xianyou County, Fujian Province, Chen graduated from the department of physics at Fudan University. She pursued her postgraduate degree at Shanghai Institute of Ceramics of Chinese Academy of Sciences, doing research of solid-state physics. Chen joined the Chinese Communist Party ("CCP") in January 1961. At the beginning of the Cultural Revolution, Chen was sent to work in an army farm for two years before returning to the Institute. In 1982, she was at Penn State University in the United States as a visiting scholar. After that, she was elevated to vice Party Chief of the Institute, and thus transformed from a scholar to a CCP official.

Chen's former posts in Shanghai included vice secretary and later, secretary of the CCP committee of Shanghai Science and Technology Commission, director of the propaganda department of Shanghai, and vice secretary of CCP Shanghai committee. During her tenure in Shanghai, Jiang Zemin, Zhu Rongji, Wu Bangguo and Huang Ju served as Shanghai's Party chief.

In August 1997, Chen was transferred to central government and appointed as vice director and leader of Party group of National Education Commission. In 1998, she became the Minister of Education. In 2003, she was further elevated to the position of State Councilor, in charge of education, culture and sports. In March 2008, Chen was elected a Vice Chairperson of the National People's Congress. On April 12, 2008, she was appointed as governor of Beijing Olympic Village.

Chen was an alternate member of 13th and 14th Central Committees of the Chinese Communist Party, and a full member of 15th, 16th, 17th Central Committees.

References

External links 
 

1942 births
Living people
Ministers of Education of the People's Republic of China
Recipients of the Olympic Order
People's Republic of China politicians from Fujian
Politicians from Putian
Political office-holders in Shanghai
Fudan University alumni
Vice Chairpersons of the National People's Congress
Women state councillors of China
Chinese Communist Party politicians from Fujian
All-China Women's Federation people